The Touch is a historical novel by Colleen McCullough published in 2003. It is about the life of a Scotswoman, Elizabeth Drummond, who travels from her home in Kinross, Scotland to New South Wales in order to marry her wealthy cousin, Alexander Kinross. The story takes place over the latter half of the 19th century.

Reception 
In the Historical Novels Review, Andrea Connel called it, "a compelling new perspective on the romantic theme of the mail- order bride" but went on to say that it was cold and impersonal, ultimately not enjoying the book. Publishers Weekly wrote that the plot was complex, but the characters won sympathy through honor. Kirkus Reviews put it simply, "a colorful tale about colorful characters in colorful places and times."  Meanwhile, for Booklist, Patty Engelmann praised it as "a fantastic and exceptional saga about the lively personalities and explosive situations that shaped Australia."

References 

2003 Australian novels
Novels by Colleen McCullough
Australian historical novels
Novels set in New South Wales
Century (imprint) books